The Au Sable River in Michigan, United States runs approximately  through the northern Lower Peninsula, through the towns of Grayling and Mio, and enters Lake Huron at the town of Oscoda. It is considered one of the best brown trout fisheries east of the Rockies and has been designated a blue ribbon trout stream by the Michigan Department of Natural Resources. A map from 1795 located in the United States Gazetteer calls it the Beauais River.  In French, the river is called the Rivière au sable, literally "Sand River".

Description 
The river drops  from its source at the junction of Kolka and Bradford Creeks.

near the boundary with Oscoda County. The North Branch rises in Bagley Township, Otsego County, near Lake Otsego.

The Au Sable then flows mostly east through Oscoda County, then south and east through Alcona County and Iosco County. The river's watershed also drains portions of Montmorency County and Ogemaw County.

Most of the main branch of the Au Sable flows through or adjacent to the Huron-Manistee National Forest.  of the river, from the Mio Pond downstream to the Alcona Pond, was designated as a National Wild and Scenic River on October 4, 1984. The watershed provides habitat for bald eagles and the endangered Kirtland's warbler. Five percent of the land in the watershed is National Forest and 29% is state forest.

It is a designated trout stream, and many canoe liveries exist along the river, which offer canoe trips from a few hours to as long as a week. The river was originally a grayling fishery with brook trout being released in the 1880s. By 1908 the grayling were gone although they were reintroduced in 1987. (See Grayling, Michigan for more information on the Grayling and the fish hatchery.) Brown trout is the current main catch. Lumbering along the river began in the 1860s and was finished by the 1910s.

The Au Sable River is also the site of a yearly  pro-am canoe race, the Au Sable River Canoe Marathon, which begins at 9:00 p.m. and runs through the night into the next day. Winning times have ranged from 14 to 21 hours. The race was first run in 1947.

River Road, running parallel with the Au Sable River, is a designated National Scenic Byway.

There are six hydro-electric power plants in the Au Sable River basin, with a total installed capacity of 41 MW and an average annual energy output of 500 GJ. The six reservoirs were constructed between 1911 and 1924.

Towns along river
Arbutus Beach, Michigan
Au Sable, Michigan
Curtisville, Michigan
Glennie, Michigan
Grayling, Michigan
Lewiston, Michigan
Lovells, Michigan
Mio, Michigan
Oscoda, Michigan
Roscommon, Michigan

River dams

Ordered from upriver to downriver, all belonging to the power company Consumers Energy:
 Mio Dam
 Alcona Dam
 Loud Dam
 Five Channels Dam
 Cooke Dam
 Foote Dam

Historical markers

The river has five historical markers on it:
 Cooke Hydroelectric Plant
 Five Channels Dam Workers Camp
 The Louis Chevalier Claim
 Mio Hydroelectric Plant
 Chief Shoppenagon

River valley attractions and events

The Michigan AuSable Valley Railroad is located in Fairview.  It is a 1/4 scale,  gauge ridable miniature railway, which offers rides on a passenger train through the scenic Northern Michigan landscape. It operates in jack pine country during the summer months.  Riders travel through parts of the Huron National Forest and overlook the beautiful Comins Creek Valley.
 Au Sable River Canoe Marathon, starts in Grayling and ends in Oscoda  down the river.  It is one of three marathon races that constitute canoe racing's Triple Crown. The race is always held the last full weekend in July.
First Dam Canoe Race (MCRA - Canoe Race) is a yearly event.
Six miles west of Oscoda, on River Road Scenic Byway, the Au Sable River Queen offers paddle boat excursions.
Within this area is Kirtland's warbler habitat, so it is an important center for bird watchers.
The Lumberman's Monument is adjacent to the river. The 14-foot Lumberman’s Monument stands on a high bank with the Au Sable River providing a scenic backdrop since 1932.
River Road, running parallel with the river, is a designated National Scenic Byway for the 23 miles that go into Oscoda.
Canoer's Memorial:   The inscription on the memorial says "The crossed paddles are a canoeist’s salute.  These paddles are erected as a tribute to those professional members of the Michigan Canoe Racing Association who were once active in the promotion and participation of canoe racing in Michigan.  As you view the waters of the AuSable or watch canoes racing on our Michigan streams, remember these departed members and their dedication to the sport of canoe racing.”
Marathon canoe racing began in 1940 and has been an annual event since then. The first casualty happened in 1953 claiming the life of Jerry Curley, and the river has claimed over 100 racers in its murky depths since then. The Curley family spearheaded the efforts to erect the monument and it is now maintained by volunteers and the U.S. Forest Service.
The Wolf Creek Trail system is a beautiful trail and boardwalk along the Au Sable River and around Wolf Creek. This trail does not have any mandatory fees for use making it free for everyone. The non-motorized trail is open to all hikers, mountain bikers, cross country skiers, snowshoers, with loops designed as long as 4.2 miles and as short as 1.8 miles. The Wolf Creek Trail, part of the Huron National Forest, has four separate loops with a total of 4.8 miles of walking paths with 3 of these miles running adjacent to the Au Sable River. This trail system is a popular hiking, walking, and cross country skiing spot for locals and tourists alike. Many hikers will use the main trailhead at the bustling Department of Natural Resources canoe launch and park, right off of M-72/33 on the east side of the bridge that crosses the Au Sable River. The park also has toilets, picnic tables, grills, a source for drinking water, and plenty of parking. Most cross country skiers will use the trailhead off of South River Road approximately 2 miles east of Mio. Skiers will encounter a few downhill slopes, but nothing too difficult, making for an overall easy ski trail.
Iargo Springs

See also
Ausable River (Lake Huron), an Ontario tributary of Lake Huron

Notes

External links

Map of Au Sable River watershed
Anglers of the Au Sable
Au Sable Canoe Marathon
Huron-Manistee National Forest
Lumberman's Monument
Lumberman's Monument at the U.S. Forest Service
River Road Scenic Byway at America's Byways.

Rivers of Michigan
Rivers of Roscommon County, Michigan
Rivers of Otsego County, Michigan
Rivers of Oscoda County, Michigan
Rivers of Alcona County, Michigan
Rivers of Iosco County, Michigan
Huron-Manistee National Forests
Tributaries of Lake Huron
Wild and Scenic Rivers of the United States